Harry J. Tindell (born October 30, 1960) is a Tennessee politician and a member of the Tennessee House of Representatives for the 13th district, which encompasses part of Knox County.

Biography
He has served as a state representative since the 97th General Assembly and was most recently re-elected as a member of the Democratic Party. He is the Chair of the House Budget Subcommittee and is a member of the House State and Local Government Committee, the House Local Government Subcommittee, the House State Government Subcommittee, the Joint Pensions and Insurance Committee, the Joint Lottery Oversight Committee, the Joint Tennessee Education Lottery Corp. Committee, and the House Finance, Ways and Means Committee. Harry Tindell graduated from Fulton High School and possesses a Bachelor of Science degree in business from the University of Tennessee at Knoxville.

In 2005, when the House of Representatives voted on whether or not to hold a referendum on writing into the state constitution an amendment banning gay marriage, Harry Tindell was one of only seven members of the House voting against the measure. In April 2006, when a bill passed the House Budget Subcommittee that would raise the minimum wage from $5.15 to $6.15, Tindell commented, "It's the right thing to do." He is the son of Knox County Clerk Billy Tindell.

References

External links 
 Harry J. Tindell's profile at the Tennessee General Assembly
The biography of Billy Tindell at the Knox County website.

1960 births
Living people
Members of the Tennessee House of Representatives
Politicians from Knoxville, Tennessee